Byakovo is a rural locality (a selo) and the administrative center of Byakovskoye Rural Settlement, Navlinsky District, Bryansk Oblast, Russia. The population was 576 as of 2010. There are 4 streets.

Geography 
Byakovo is located 8 km northeast of Navlya (the district's administrative centre) by road. Muravyevka is the nearest rural locality.

References 

Rural localities in Navlinsky District